Buchonomyia is the only extant genus of the subfamily Buchonomyiinae of the non-biting midge family Chironomidae. There are three known extant species and one fossil species in the genus: Members of the genus are parasitic of psychomyiid caddisflies.
Buchonomyia thienemanni Fittkau, 1955
Buchonomyia burmanica Brundin and Sæther, 1978
Buchonomyia brundini Andersen and Sæther, 1995
†Buchonomyia succinea Seredszus and Wichard 2003 (Eocene, Baltic amber)

In addition, two extinct genera belonging to Buchonomyiinae are known:

 †Dungeyella Jarzembowski et al. 2008 (Barremian, Wessex Formation)
 †Furcobuchonomyia  Baranov et al. 2017 (Cenomanian, Burmese amber)

References

Chironomidae